Daniel J. Halloran III (born March 16, 1971) is a former member of the New York City Council. He was indicted on corruption charges in 2013, did not run for reelection, was convicted in July 2014, and is currently back in the private sector on Long Island. He was the first adherent of Theodism ever elected to the council and one of the first neo-Pagans in hold an elected office in the US.

Personal life
Halloran was raised in a "traditional Irish household" and was a karaoke host and an attorney prior to running for office. He earned his Juris Doctor (J.D.) from St. John's University Law School and a B.A. in history and anthropology from the City University of New York. He worked in the New York City Police Department and several District Attorneys' offices before entering private practice as a lawyer in a firm with offices in Queens and Long Island.

City council service
Halloran was elected to the New York City Council from the 19th district, in Queens, on November 3, 2009, succeeding Tony Avella, who made a failed bid to become the Democratic nominee for Mayor of New York City. He was endorsed by the Republican, Libertarian, Independence and Conservative parties. He represented nearly 200,000 residents. In September 2010, he was named one of City Hall'''s "40 under 40" for being a young influential member of New York City politics.

Halloran sat on the Fire & Criminal Justice, Public Safety, Land Use (including Landmarks, Public Siting & Maritime Uses sub-committee), Public Housing, and Mental Health, Mental Retardation, Alcoholism, Drug Abuse and Disability Services committees.

Political views
Halloran is a registered Republican, a fiscal conservative and libertarian. He opposes the Patient Protection and Affordable Care Act ("ObamaCare"). He appeared as a regular commentator on the Strategy Room on Fox News where he  discussed matters ranging from healthcare reform to government spending, off-shore oil exploration, and other conservative and libertarian principles.

He was purportedly asked to run for U.S. Congress in the 2010 election cycle in the 5th District of New York by Republican, Libertarian, and Conservative leaders. Despite being courted by the NRCC and Representative Peter T. King to run, he withdrew from consideration, citing the economic crisis in the New York City and state budgets and the need to set the city's finances in order before he could consider taking on a run for any other office.

Dan Halloran became the first elected official in New York City to publicly criticize the Park51 (Cordoba House) project near Ground Zero of the World Trade Center site, stating, "If we want a nation of peace... then peace comes with understanding. And they need to understand that this is sacred ground to New Yorkers." "New York City is the greatest city in the world [a place of religious tolerance, but that tolerance] starts when you say 'I understand your pain, and I am not going to inflict more on you.'

Allegation of work slowdown
Halloran attracted widespread attention when he stated that five municipal employees had told him of a deliberate slowdown in clearing snow after a blizzard in December 2010. The slowdown was allegedly organized to put Mayor Michael Bloomberg in a bad light. His comments precipitated multiple criminal investigations. However, the two workers he identified did not corroborate his story, and he refused to name the three others, citing alleged "attorney-client privilege".

Religion
Halloran's study of the Viking Age and field research in Ireland led him to develop an interest in Germanic paganism, and eventually to Theodism, which has attracted widespread attention. He is a member of the New Normannii Reik, a branch of Heathenism. The Village Voice described Halloran as "America's First Elected Heathen"; another Reconstructionist Neopagan adherent, Jessica Orsini (who is Hellenic), had previously been elected to the city council of Centralia, Missouri in 2006.

Halloran's religion became an issue during his campaign for a city council seat after it was revealed that he was an adherent of Theodism. On his group's website, Halloran offered the following descriptions of his beliefs: "We believe in and honor the Gods and Goddesses of the North, spirits of the land, and the memories of our ancestors" and described his group as "a cultural, religious and martial organization; dedicated to reviving the folkways of the Norman peoples of Northern Europe." Odin, Tyr and Freyr are among the deities worshipped by the group. Halloran also stated that "It is our hope to reconstruct the pre-Christian religion of the Germanic branch of the Indo-European peoples, within a cultural framework and community environment." When asked about his beliefs, Halloran said, "I was raised a Roman Catholic right here in Auburndale. I was baptized into the Catholic Church and took my confirmation at 13. I attended Jesuit schools. Then and now, faith is a cornerstone of my life." Halloran served as legal counsel and incorporating attorney for the New York City Pagan Pride Project.

State Senator Frank Padavan stated that he felt Halloran's religion should not be an issue: "We have every religion under the sun in this district... It's all here; so what? As long as everybody is properly motivated, so be it." These sentiments were echoed by the Queens County Republican Party chairman, Phil Ragusa, who additionally described Halloran as "a traditional person" and "a regular guy". Halloran lectured and discussed his theology on a national level.The Village Voice'' reported on Halloran's two years in office in the paper's November 30 – December 6, 2011 edition in a report entitled "America's Top Heathen". The report pointed out that when Halloran was elected in an off-year campaign, he was the "'First Atheling' or prince, of his own Theodish tribe, called New Normandy. He had 'thralls' who swore their allegiance to him... he led his flock, about 100 people at its height, in their polytheistic celebration of the gods". However, on election night, November 4, 2009, Halloran thanked his law partner, promising, "The next time you give me advice to take a website down, I'll do it", referring to the now defunct New Normandy website, which had contained "images of Halloran in medieval garb, hoisting drinking horns and other regalia that he [Halloran] had apparently found embarrassing."

2012 Congressional campaign

On March 26, 2012 Halloran announced that he would campaign for a vacant US Representative seat in the newly redistricted 6th congressional district. He was the only Republican nominee, and was cross-endorsed by the New York State Conservative Party and was their nominee. He was also designated by the Libertarian Party at their state convention in April 2012. However, in the November 2012 general election, he lost to the Democratic candidate, Grace Meng.

Conviction for political corruption
On April 2, 2013, Halloran was arrested along with Democratic New York State Senator Malcolm A. Smith, Bronx Republican Party Chairman Joseph J. Savino, Queens Republican Party Vice Chairman Vincent Tabone, Spring Valley Mayor Noramie Jasmin, and Spring Valley Deputy Mayor Joseph Desmaret, on federal corruption charges. The complaint by the United States Attorney for the Southern District of New York and the New York FBI field office alleged that Smith attempted to secure a spot on the Republican ballot in the 2013 New York City mayoral election through a complex scheme involving the bribery of several county Republican Party leaders in New York City. As part of the scheme, Halloran allegedly facilitated the Smith bribes and also accepted over $18,000 in cash from an undercover agent and a cooperating witness. On May 1, 2013, Halloran announced that he would not seek re-election for his city council seat.

On July 29, 2014, Halloran was convicted of taking bribes, orchestrating payoffs, and participating in the scheme to help Democrat Smith to run for mayor on the 2013 ballot as a Republican. He was convicted both of acting as a liaison between Smith and Republican Party officials and of taking at least $15,000 in bribes for designating about $80,000 in New York City funds to a nonprofit entity, allowing the money to be embezzled through a no-show job.

On March 4, 2015, Halloran was sentenced to 10 years in prison for the bribery conviction. He has currently returned to private life on Long Island and is still on appeal to the 2nd Circuit US Court if Appeals as of February 2020.

References

External links

1971 births
Adherents of Germanic neopaganism
American libertarians
American modern pagans
American people of Irish descent
Converts to pagan religions from Christianity
Queens College, City University of New York alumni
St. John's University School of Law alumni
Fordham University alumni
Former Roman Catholics
Living people
New York City Council members
New York (state) lawyers
New York (state) Republicans
People from Queens, New York
New York (state) politicians convicted of crimes
New York (state) politicians convicted of corruption